The Return of Tharn is a fantasy novel by American writer Howard Browne.  It was first published in book form in 1956 by The Grandon Company in an edition of 500 copies, although 150 of the copies were lost to flood damage and perhaps another 150 show some water damage.  

The novel was originally serialized in three parts in the magazine Amazing Stories beginning in October, 1948.  The book is a sequel to Browne's Warrior of the Dawn (1943).

The novel concerns the prehistoric adventures of Tharn.

Sources

External links 
 
 (serial version)

1956 American novels
American fantasy novels
Novels first published in serial form
Works originally published in Amazing Stories
Novels set in prehistory